The accolade (also known as dubbing or adoubement) was the central act in the rite of passage ceremonies conferring knighthood in the Middle Ages. From about 1852, the term accolade was used much more generally to mean "praise" or "award" or "honour".

Etymology

Accolade was first used in 1611 and is French, from Occitan acolada. This, in turn, came from the Latin ad ("to") + collum ("neck") and in Occitan originally meant "embrace".

Accolade is akin to "dubbing" or "to dub" since the tap on the shoulder with the knighting sword is accepted to be the point at which the title is awarded.

History

Ceremony

The accolade is a ceremony to confer knighthood. It may take many forms, including the tapping of the flat side of a knighting sword on the shoulders of a candidate (who is himself sometimes referred to as an accolade during the ceremony) or an embrace about the neck.

There is some disagreement among historians on the actual ceremony and in what time period certain methods could have been used. It could have been an embrace or a slight blow on the neck or cheek. Gregory of Tours wrote that the early kings of France, in conferring the gilt shoulder-belt, kissed the knights on the left cheek. In knighting his son Henry with the ceremony of the accolade, history records that William the Conqueror used the blow.

The earliest reference to the knighting as a formal ceremony in Germany is in the Annals of Aachen under the year 1184, when the Emperor Frederick I's sons, Henry VI and Frederick VI, "were made knights" (facti sunt milites).

The blow, or colée, when first utilized was given with a bare fist, a stout box on the ear. This was later substituted for by a gentle stroke with the flat part of the sword against the side of the neck. This then developed into the custom of tapping on either the right or left shoulder, or both, which is still the tradition in the United Kingdom today.

An early Germanic coming-of-age ceremony, of presenting a youth with a weapon that was buckled on him, was elaborated in the 10th and 11th centuries as a sign that the minor had come of age. Initially this was a simple rite often performed on the battlefield, where writers of Romance enjoyed placing it. A panel in the Bayeux Tapestry shows the knighting of Harold by William of Normandy, but the specific gesture is not clearly represented. Another military knight (commander of an army), sufficiently impressed by a warrior's loyalty, would tap a fighting soldier on his back and shoulder with the flat of his sword and announce that he was now an official knight. Some words that might be spoken at that moment were Advances Chevalier au nom de Dieu.

In medieval France, early ceremonies of the adoubement were purely secular and indicated a young noble coming of age. Around 1200, these ceremonies began to include elements of Christian ritual (such as a night spent in prayers, prior to the rite ).

The increasingly impressive ceremonies surrounding adoubement figured largely in the Romance literature, both in French and in Middle English, particularly those set in the Trojan War or around the legendary personage of Alexander the Great.

Promotion steps
The process of becoming a knight generally included these stages:

Page – A child started training at the age of 7, he will begin learning about obedience, manners, and other important skills.
Squire – At the age of 14, the young man would observe and help other knights. Occupying a position comparable to an apprenticeship, he managed equipment and weapons such as arrows. He learned the use of weapons while hunting with the knights. He went into recruit training to learn how to become a military fighter. At the age of 21, if judged worthy, he was bestowed the accolade of knighthood. Squires, and even soldiers, could also be conferred direct knighthood early if they showed valor and efficiency for their service; such acts may include deploying for an important quest or mission, or protecting a high diplomat or a royal relative in battle.
Knight – A special kind of trained soldier, often cavalry, serving a lord (nobleman or royalty). Knights had particular status in feudal society.

Accolade in the 21st century

France
Newly inducted military Knights of the Legion of Honour are struck on both shoulders with a sword (Army and Navy) or a dirk (Air Force), if the ceremony is presided over by a military authority. Civilian members and all members of lesser orders (Merit, Arts and Letters...) are not dubbed with a bladed weapon. They receive only the accolade, which has kept in French its ancient meaning of "embrace".

Officers in the French Armed Forces also receive the accolade, but a different version. When they graduate, during the ceremony a senior officer hovers their sword on the kneeling graduate's shoulders as if he were knighting the young officer. This part is called the "adoubement", which has a different meaning than accolade. Adoubement involves the sword, accolade is a movement of the hands which varies in different countries. In France, it can be akin to a hug or a hand on the shoulder.

Netherlands
In the Netherlands, the knights in the exclusive Military Order of William (the Dutch "Victoria Cross") are struck on the left shoulder with the palm of the hand, first by the Dutch monarch (if present) then by the other knights. The new knight does not kneel.

United Kingdom

All newly created knights in the UK are dubbed on both shoulders with a sword by the monarch or the prince delegated by them. In the first example, the "knight-elect" kneels in front of the monarch on a knighting-stool.  First, the monarch lays the side of the sword's blade onto the accolade's right shoulder. The monarch then raises the sword just up over the apprentice's head, flips it counterclockwise so that the same side of the blade will come in contact with the knight's body, and places it on his left shoulder. The new knight then stands up, and the king or queen presents him with the insignia of his new order. Contrary to popular belief, the phrase "Arise, Sir ..." is not used. There are currently eleven different knighthoods being bestowed: Knights Bachelor, Knights Commanders and Knights Grand Cross of the Order of the British Empire, Royal Victorian Order, Order of Saint Michael and Saint George and Order of the Bath, Knights Companions of the Order of the Thistle and the Order of the Garter.

Women who are awarded damehoods do not receive the accolade.

Clergy receiving a knighthood are not dubbed. The use of a sword in this kind of a ceremony is believed to be inappropriate.

Vatican
Knights of the Equestrian Order of the Holy Sepulchre of Jerusalem, an Order of chivalry under the protection of the Holy See, are dubbed in the head and on both shoulders during the investiture ceremony. The accolade is given during Holy Mass, by the officiating Prelate.

Central Europe
The accolade is also performed today with the unrecognized Habsburg Order of St. George during the investiture with a sword on both shoulders. The ceremony including the oath is performed by Karl von Habsburg or Georg von Habsburg. The knights kneel and the sword touches both shoulders.

See also
Feudalism
Vigil

References

Bloch, Marc: Feudal Society, tr. Manyon. London: Routledge, Keagn Paul (1965)
Boulton, D'Arcy Jonathan Dacre. The Knights of the Crown: the Monarchical Orders of Knighthood in Later Medieval Europe, 1325-1520. 2d revised ed. Woodbridge, Suffolk: Boydell Press, 2000.
Keen, Maurice; Chivalry, New Haven: Yale University Press, 1984, 
Robards, Brooks; The Medieval Knight at War, UK: Tiger Books, 1997, 

Feudalism
Chivalry
Warfare of the Middle Ages
Rites of passage